Jan Mooy (8 September 1776 in Callantsoog – 15 September 1847 in Den Helder), was a Dutch painter.

Mooy painted primarily marine art and watercolors. One of his works can be found at the Peabody Essex Museum.

References

1776 births
1847 deaths
Dutch male painters
Dutch marine artists
People from Zijpe